Boops boops (from Ancient Greek , literally 'cow-eye'), commonly called the bogue, is a species of seabream native to the eastern Atlantic. Its common name in most languages refers to its large ("bug") eyes.

Distribution and habitat
The species is found off the coasts of Europe, Africa, the Azores and the Canary Islands, from Norway to Angola, and in the Mediterranean and Black Seas. It avoids brackish waters such as the Baltic Sea.

Ecology

It consumes seaweed, crustaceans, and some plankton, in schools that rise to the surface at night. Individuals can reach , but average . 
Sex determination in the bogue is unclear. It has variously been described as a rudimentary intersex organism, with a few intersex individuals, or a protogynous intersex, with individuals starting out life as females, and some becoming male later on.

Human use

The species is commercially fished, with 37,830 tonnes taken in 2008. It is marketed in sizes from Small (1/2, 2/3), Medium (2/4, 3/5, 4/6), Large (4/8, 4/7, 5/7, 5/8). Sizes are not standardized, but the mentioned sizes are often used in commercial transactions. When cleaned and pan fried, broiled or baked fresh, they are good tasting, but when stored their gut flora soon spread unpleasant flavors to their flesh. Much of the catch is used for fishmeal or tuna fishing bait.

Parasites
The bogue is host to a wide variety of parasites, ranging from metazoans such as monogenean flatworms (e.g. Microcotyle isyebi and Cyclocotyla bellones) acanthocephalan spiny-headed worms, nematode roundworms, isopod and copepod crustaceans and myxozoan cnidarians to the unicellular dinoflagellate Ichthyodinium chabelardi, a parasite lethal to eggs developing in ovaries. At least 67 metazoan parasite species have been reported from the species. In the aftermath of the 2002 Prestige oil spill, the community of parasitic species inhabiting bogue caught off the coast of Spain was noticeably altered.

References

External links

 

Sparidae
Commercial fish
Fish of the Atlantic Ocean
Fish of the Mediterranean Sea
Fish of the Black Sea
Fish of the North Sea
Fish described in 1758
Taxa named by Carl Linnaeus